Sir William Parker Strait is a waterway in the Qikiqtaaluk Region of Nunavut, Canada. It separates Helena Island (to the north-west) from Bathurst Island (to the south-east).

Straits of Qikiqtaaluk Region